The 1998 Arizona Wildcats football team represented the University of Arizona during the 1998 NCAA Division I-A football season. Led by head coach Dick Tomey in his twelfth season, the Wildcats captured a 12–1 record (7–1 against Pac-10 opponents) during the year. It was Arizona's first 11-or-more-win season in school history and the best record to date, which surpassed the 1993 team’s record of ten wins. A loss to UCLA in the middle of the regular season prevented the Wildcats from earning an outright Pac-10 title and a potential spot in the Rose Bowl. The team appeared in the Holiday Bowl, and defeating Nebraska to complete the season.

Before the season
Arizona finished the 1997 season with a 7–5 record and won the Insight.com Bowl over New Mexico (an old rival of the Wildcats) that was played at the Wildcats’ home field. The offense improved late in the season and concluded the year on a winning streak. Soon after the season ended, offensive coordinator Homer Smith announced his retirement due to health reasons and Arizona had to get a new coordinator to build the offense. During the offseason, Tomey believed that the late season surge by the team would motivate them for 1998.

With most of the offense returning along with several starters on defense, the Wildcats entered the preseason as contenders for the Pac-10 title and looked to improve on their 1997 record for more wins. They were also ranked in the top 25 polls for the first time since the 1995 season.

Schedule

Rankings

Game summaries

Hawaii
To begin the season, the Wildcats traveled to Hawaii, where Tomey formerly coached prior to joining Arizona. The Wildcats returned the opening kickoff for a touchdown that would energize the team. The Rainbow Warriors would have no chance after that and Arizona did enough to get the victory.

Iowa
In the home opener, Arizona hosted Iowa. The Hawkeyes’ defense played tough to start the year, but the Wildcats’ offense would torch them all game long and Arizona got the win in front of a raucous crowd to go to 3–0 on the season for the first time since 1994.

Washington
On the road in Seattle, the Wildcats faced Washington in tough environment. Both teams would hang with each other in terms of scoring and by the fourth quarter, the Huskies took the lead and were poised to pull the upset. On Arizona's final drive, however, they would get closer to the end zone with a chance at survival. In the closing seconds, Wildcat quarterback Ortege Jenkins ran the ball, tried to dive into the end zone, took a low hit around the shin area and front flipped across the goal line for the game winning touchdown with 6 seconds left and Arizona remained unbeaten and won against Washington for the first time since their big upset over them in 1992.

UCLA

After winning a wild one at Washington, the Wildcats returned home for their next game against third-ranked UCLA, which was a big test for both teams. In a battle between two undefeated top ten teams (Arizona was ranked tenth) with the winner taking control of the Pac-10 at the time.

Arizona started would start off the game with an early 14–7 lead before the Bruins answered back. Both teams would trade scores back and forth, which led to the score tied at halftime. In the second half, the Wildcats regained the lead at 28–24 before UCLA took it back in the final minute of the quarter before the game turned around in the fourth.

In the final quarter, Arizona tried to respond, but would make turnovers that would lead to the Bruins scoring for good. More mistakes by Arizona led to another touchdown by the Bruins to break the game open and the Wildcats never recovered. With the 52–28 win, UCLA showed why they were in contention for a national championship and ended the Wildcats’ chances at a perfect season, like they did in 1993.

Oregon
On Halloween, 13th-ranked Arizona hosted Oregon. It seemed that Tucson would be a scary place for the 12th-ranked Ducks (due to the game being played on Halloween) as the Wildcats would dominate in all phases and cruised to a win.

California
Arizona, ranked ninth, visited Berkeley for a game against a struggling Golden Bears team. The game would be close, but the Wildcats would ultimately survive an upset bid from Cal to earn their tenth victory, which tied the 1993 team's record for most wins in a single season. The win also avenged Arizona's four-overtime loss to the Bears in their previous trip to Berkeley in 1996.

Arizona State

 Source: USA Today
    
    
    
    
    
    
    
    
    
    
    
    
    
    
    

The Wildcats entered the “Duel in the Desert” against Arizona State looking for their eleventh win. The Sun Devils led for most of the first half before Arizona running back Trung Canidate broke off an 80-yard touchdown run to put the Wildcats ahead before halftime.

In the second half, Arizona seemingly took control before ASU cut into the Wildcat lead. Canidate would add a pair of long rushing touchdowns as the Wildcats began to pull away with a 50–35 lead. Arizona State would later score a touchdown to get within eight. After stopping the Wildcats, the Devils had one last chance in the closing minute. Needing a touchdown and a two-point conversion to force overtime, ASU threw a pass toward the end zone that would fall incomplete as time expired, and Arizona captured their 11th win that broke the record of ten set in 1993. Canidate rushed for 288 yards, which broke the single-game Arizona record held by Jim Upchurch's 232 yards against UTEP in 1973.

Nebraska (Holiday Bowl)

After beating Arizona State, the Wildcats waited for a bowl berth. With UCLA already clinching the Pac-10 title and being unbeaten, they would collapse against Miami, which ended their quest for a national title and prevented Arizona from possibly going to the Rose Bowl as an at-large team. As a result, the Wildcats were invited to the Holiday Bowl against Nebraska and the Bruins went to the Rose Bowl.

Nebraska came into the Holiday Bowl a year after winning a share of the national championship and longtime coach Tom Osborne retiring afterwards. Arizona believed that they had a chance against the Cornhuskers despite Nebraska having a new coach.

In the bowl game, Arizona would open the scoring with three field goals before Nebraska responded with 13 unanswered points to lead at the half. After neither team scored in the third quarter, the Wildcats retook the lead in the fourth. The Cornhuskers would answer back to grab a 20–16 lead. Arizona would then drive down the field to regain the lead at 23–20 with over four minutes remaining. Nebraska tried to come back, but the Wildcats would intercept them. Arizona then ran out the clock and ended the season with their 12th win.

Awards and honors
 Trung Canidate, RB, First-team All-Pac-10
 Chris McAlister, CB, Consensus and AP All-American, First-team All-Pac-10
 Yusuf Scott, OL, Pac-10 Morris Trophy winner (offense), First-team All-Pac-10
 Marcus Bell, LB, First-team All-Pac-10
 Edwin Mulitalo, OL, First-team All-Pac-10
 Daniel Greer, DB, First-team All-Pac-10
 DaShon Polk, LB, Second-team All-Pac-10
 Keith Smith, QB, Second-team All-Pac-10
 Jeremy McDaniel, WR, Second-team All-Pac-10

Team players drafted into the NFL

Season notes
 Arizona played twelve games in the regular season for the first time since 1977.
 The Wildcats began the season by returning the opening kickoff for a touchdown against Hawaii. They would not return another kickoff for a score again until 2009.
 The Wildcats opened the year with two consecutive road games for the first time since 1973.
 The Arizona Stadium field changed yet again, as the “Block ‘A’” and “Bear Down” were now smaller and were on each 25-yard line and there was no logo at midfield (the 50-yard line). The “Bear Down” returned to being in blue letters after it was in red in 1997.
 After beating Iowa at home, Arizona did not face the Hawkeyes again until 2009. Also, they would not beat both Arizona State and Oregon at home again until 2004 and 2007 respectively, and Oregon State until 2005.
 This was the last time that Arizona would defeat Washington under Tomey, as he would resign in 2000 and the Wildcats next defeated the Huskies with a different coach in 2003 and would not win in Seattle again until 2004.
 The game-winning touchdown against Washington was known to Wildcat fans as the “Leap by the Lake”, referencing Jenkins’ flip across the end zone and Husky Stadium being located near Lake Washington. Fans often rated the play as the second greatest moment in Arizona football history behind Chuck Cecil’s interception return touchdown against Arizona State in 1986 as well as the team’s second biggest win over the Huskies behind their upset victory in 1992.
 There were rumors that the Arizona–UCLA game was going to feature ESPN’s College GameDay visiting Tucson and the game to be aired in prime-time on ABC. However, GameDay visited Tennessee–Georgia as it was a bigger matchup (Tennessee would win that game and ultimately the national championship) and ABC aired a late afternoon game between Notre Dame and Arizona, with Arizona–UCLA airing on FSN due to it being broadcast late at 7:00 p.m. PT. GameDay did involve Arizona in the 1999 season opener and it wouldn’t be until 2009 that it would come to Arizona’s campus.
 The loss to UCLA proved to be the only one for the Wildcats in the season. The Bruins had also given Arizona a first loss in 1993 and would do so again in 2015, leading to fans referring to UCLA as “the team that ends Arizona’s unbeaten chances”. The loss would also prevent Arizona from finishing the year with a perfect record for the first time in modern history and likely kept them from possibly playing for the national championship.
 This would be the only year where Arizona played Northeast Louisiana (now known as Louisiana–Monroe).
 The win over California was the first time that the two teams did not play in overtime since the extra time period was introduced in 1996. Both Arizona and California played overtime in 1996–97 and split the two (the Wildcats won the 1997 game).
 Arizona's 50 points against Arizona State was the most scored against their rivals since 1954 when they scored 54.
 Canidate's 288 school-record yards rushing against ASU would later be broken in 2012 by Ka’Deem Carey’s 366 yards against Colorado.
 The win over ASU would be Tomey’s last over them, as he would not defeat them again before stepping down in 2000.
 This season would be the biggest near-miss at the Rose Bowl for the Wildcats, as they watched UCLA blow a big lead against Miami that would have sent the Bruins to the national title game (the Fiesta Bowl) and Arizona to Pasadena for the very first time.
 Arizona would play at a stadium twice this season, as they played at San Diego State and the Holiday Bowl at the same stadium. It was the first time since 1993 that the Wildcats played two games at the same stadium, when they played back-to-back games in Tempe (ASU in the regular season finale and the Fiesta Bowl against Miami).
 This was Arizona’s first Holiday Bowl. They would not return to the bowl again until 2009, where, coincidentally, they would play Nebraska again and would ultimately lose.
 The Wildcats’ explosive offense was known for scoring lots of points this season, and fans referred to them as the “Desert Storm”, which was a pun of the team's “Desert Swarm” defense in the early 1990s (the phrase was named after a U.S. military operation during the 1991 Gulf War).
 Jenkins, Canidate, along with quarterback Keith Smith and wide receivers Dennis Northcutt and Jeremy McDaniel led the offense, while the defense was led by cornerback and kick returner Chris McAlister, who wreaked havoc on opposing offenses (McAlister was the one who returned the opening kickoff for a touchdown against Hawaii to start the year and was the only player to return a kickoff, punt and interception for a score in the same season). All of them were huge factors in the Wildcats’ 12–1 record. Both Jenkins and Smith were part of the Wildcats’ two-way quarterback system that began in 1997 and would continue until 1999 when Smith graduated. Most of them earned all-Pac-10 honors in this season.
 Had Arizona finished the season with a perfect record and won the Pac-10 title and either the Rose Bowl or national title, Canidate and McAlister would have likely won at least a share of the conference's offensive and defensive player of the year awards respectively and Tomey would have also won the Pac-10 coach of the year as well. McAlister would have also won major defensive awards as well.
 This was the first and only season in which Arizona finished ranked in the BCS polls. They would not finish a season as a ranked team again until 2014.
 This was only Arizona's second ten-win season in program history, which joined the 1993 team (10–2 record that year). The twelve wins this season remain a school record to this day and many fans refer to the 1998 team as the greatest in Wildcat football history.
 After the season, Arizona torn down their scoreboard behind the north end zone and replaced it with a new dynamic one for 1999.

After the season
Arizona attempted to build on the success of the 1998 season by contending for both the Rose Bowl and a potential national title in 1999, but would falter during that season and would begin an era of futility for the program and led to Tomey resigning after the 2000 season. As a result, the Wildcats would not finish with both another winning record or bowl appearance until 2008.

References

Arizona
Arizona Wildcats football seasons
Holiday Bowl champion seasons
Arizona Wildcats football